Deputies elected to the 53rd legislature (February 1, 2007 – February 1, 2010), according to the results of Brazilian general elections, 2006

Legislative branch of Brazil